The 2003 European 10,000m Cup was the 7th edition of the annual 10,000 metres competition between European athletes, which was held at Agios Kosmas Stadium in Athens, Greece on 12 April. A total of 66 athletes (36 men and 30 women) from 17 European nations entered the competition, plus three Kenyan pacemakers running as guests.

Portugal won both the men's and women's team events with combined times of 1:24:43.85 and 1:36:27.97 hours, led by men's individual runner-up Eduardo Henriques and women's individual winner Fernanda Ribeiro. Ismaïl Sghyr of France won the men's individual race in 27:45.14 minutes.

Results

Men's individual

Women's individual

Men's team 

 Athletes in  italics  did not score for their team but received medals

Women's team 

 Athletes in  italics  did not score for their team but received medals

References

Results
Results. Association of Road Racing Statisticians. Retrieved 2020-05-24.
Copa De Europa 10.000 metros. Royal Spanish Athletics Federation. Retrieved 2020-05-24.

External links
 European Athletics website 

European 10,000m Cup
European Cup 10,000m
Sports competitions in Athens
International athletics competitions hosted by Greece
10,000m Cup
10,000m Cup
April 2003 sports events in Europe